Tashi Air Pvt. Ltd, trading as Bhutan Airlines, is Bhutan's first private airline. Its head office is in Thimphu.

The airline resumed services on 10 October 2013, beginning its first international flights to India and Thailand. The airline served the cities of Jakar and Trashigang in Bhutan from their commencement until June 2012, suspending them due to increasing financial losses; however, following an agreement with the Bhutan government, the airline has resumed a full schedule of flights including Kolkata to Paro, Bhutan.

History
The airline, then known as Tashi Air, was launched on 4 December 2011. The airline is a subsidiary of the Tashi Group. The airline began regular scheduled flights to Bathpalathang and Yonphula on 18 December 2011. After only six months of operation, however, the airline asked the Bhutanese Government for permission to suspend domestic flights.

The airline resumed services on 10 October 2013 as Bhutan Airlines, having secured the wet lease of a single Airbus A320 aircraft from a Lithuanian-based company. Flights to Kolkata and continuing on to Bangkok were offered initially. The airline was required to resume domestic flights by October 2014, per an agreement with the Government of Bhutan. Following the completion of its wet lease contract, Tashi Air acquired an Airbus A319 aircraft with a seating capacity of 122 passengers on 1 May 2014. It received a second Airbus A319 on 30 July 2014.

Offices
Bhutan Airlines' head office is located in Tashi Mall, opposite Taj Tashi Hotel in Thimpu. The airline also has another office in Paro along with the airport office. The major offices of Bhutan Airlines are located in Kolkata, India and in Bangkok, Thailand - where they are represented by OMG Experience Co., Ltd. as GSA (General Sales Agent in Thailand). Other offices are located in Kathmandu, Nepal and in Malaysia.

Destinations

The airline was awaiting clearance during 2015 to operate flights to Bagdogra Airport, India. It was also hoping to start operations from Durgapur, once MoU was signed between Tashi Air and BAPL Durgapur in January 2016. Other planned destinations include Dhaka, Singapore, Dubai, and Hong Kong.

Fleet

The Bhutan Airlines fleet consists of the following aircraft (as of September 2019):

See also

 Druk Air

References

External links
 Bhutan Airlines Official Website

Airlines of Bhutan
Airlines established in 2011
2011 establishments in Bhutan
Paro District
Tashi Group
Companies based in Thimphu